Beachville is an inner suburb of Nelson, New Zealand. It lies at the western edge of Nelson city centre, to the southeast of Port Nelson.

Beachville includes a park, Fountain Reserve, and a public garden, Fountain Place Gardens.

Demographics
Beachville is part of the Britannia statistical area.

Education

Auckland Point School, a co-educational state primary school for Year 1 to 8 students, is located in Beachville.

The Nelson Teen Parent Unit is located next to the primary school.

References

Suburbs of Nelson, New Zealand
Populated places in the Nelson Region